Carsten Johan Koch (born April 27, 1945) is a Danish economist and former Social Democratic politician and minister.

He was born in Kongens Lyngby, Denmark, to tailor Robert Koch and Elly J. Koch.

He graduated from Lyngby State School in 1964 and received a cand.polit. from the University of Copenhagen in 1971.

From 1973 to 1975 he was a graduate student in the Department of Economics of the University of Copenhagen, and in 1975 he became an assistant professor and then from 1978 to 1982 an associate professor there.

In 1993 he became head of the department, in 1994 the director, and later in 1994 the treasurer.

In 2009, Carsten Koch was appointed CEO of LD (now ) on a two-year contract.

In 2014, he was chairman of the Expert Committee on Active Employment Efforts (the Carsten Koch Committee).

Political career
 Tax Minister in the Poul Nyrup Rasmussen II Cabinet from 1 November 1994 to 30 December 1996
 Tax Minister in the Poul Nyrup Rasmussen III Cabinet from 30 December 1996 to 23 March 1998
 Minister of Health in the Poul Nyrup Rasmussen IV Cabinet from 23 March 1998 to 23 February 2000
 Member of the Folketing for Frederiksborg County Council from 11 March 1998 to 31 August 2000

External links
 

1945 births
Living people
Danish economists
Social Democrats (Denmark) politicians
Danish Tax Ministers
Danish Health Ministers
20th-century Danish politicians
University of Copenhagen alumni
Academic staff of the University of Copenhagen
People from Kongens Lyngby
Members of the Folketing 1998–2001